Keith Robertson may refer to:

 Keith Robertson (writer) (1914–1991), American writer of children's books and murder mysteries
 Keith Robertson (rugby union, born 1954), former Scottish rugby union player
 Keith Robertson (Australian footballer) (born 1938), former Australian rules footballer
 Keith Robertson (rugby union coach), rugby player